Mud River railway station is located in the community of Mud River, Ontario, Canada. This station is currently in use by Via Rail. Transcontinental Canadian trains stop here.

External links
 Mud River railway station

Via Rail stations in Ontario
Railway stations in Thunder Bay District